Covers is the first English-language cover album released by Beni Arashiro under her new label Universal Music Japan under the mononym Beni on March 21, 2012.
This album contains cover songs from popular Japanese male singers in Japan. However, the original Japanese lyrics have been translated to English by Beni herself. 
The 13th song will be chosen by the fans through a request page. The song chosen by the fans is Naoto Inti Raymi's song "Ima no Kimi wo Wasurenai" Covers has been certified Gold by RIAJ for shipment of 100,000 copies. On 16 May, it was announced that Covers sold over 100,000 copies.making it Beni's highest ranked and best selling album so far. The website announced on 21 August, that a Deluxe version of "Covers" was going to be released on 12 September 2012. The new version would include a DVD with music video's and live video footage.

Background

Covers is the first cover album released by BENI and first album recording in English since her debut. It is a Japanese to English cover album that includes covers of songs by Japanese male singers, translated from their original songs to this album. The song "Ti Amo" was released as digital single. In the 3rd week of the release of Covers, the album made the #3 spot on the Oricon charts while it made the #4 spot in the first week.

Chart performance
The song "Ti Amo" debuted on the weekly Recochoku charts on #9. The album reached #1 in iTunes Japan and stayed #1 for 5 days. This is the first of Beni's album recorded in English but she did not plan to release the album in the US or any English speaking countries . In the first week, Covers got the weekly spot #7 on the Oricon chart. On 9 April, in the 3rd week after her release, Covers got the #2 spot on the daily oricon charts ranking.  While in its first week of the release of the album, the highest daily Oricon ranking it got was #4. At the end of the 3rd chart week of Covers, the album ranked at #3. On April 18 it was announced Covers shipped already over 150,000 copies. And because of this success, the album would be released through iTunes in 51 countries. At the end of the 7th week, the album got the weekly Oricon spot #7, selling about 18,000 copies which was more than its opening week. In the 8th week of the release of the album, the album reached #1 on the daily Oricon ranking. The album became a huge success: ranking #2 on the Oricon weekly charts and selling even more copies than "Lovebox" (which ranked #1 on Oricon weekly charts).

Track listing
All English translation by BENI, except noted.

Charts
Oricon Overall Sales Chart (Japan)

Charts and certifications

Japan Charts

Oricon Charts

Sales and certifications

References 

2012 compilation albums
Beni (singer) albums